Samoa–Turkey relations are foreign relations between Samoa and Turkey. The Turkish ambassador in Wellington, New Zealand is accredited to Samoa since April 12, 1979.

Diplomatic Relations 
Turkey and Samoa have friendly relations. Through TIKA, Turkey cooperates with the European Investment Bank and JICA on the development of school buildings, district hospitals and reductions of the financial burden on the Samoan Development Bank through loan forgiveness.

Turkey also contributes—US $60.5 million to date— to Samoa Development Bank's lending programs to farmers and fishermen at large.

Diplomatic Visits

Economic Relations 
 Trade volume between the two countries was negligible million USD in 2019.

See also 
 Foreign relations of Samoa
 Foreign relations of Turkey

References 

Turkey
Bilateral relations of Turkey